In enzymology, an UDP-N-acetylglucosamine 1-carboxyvinyltransferase is an enzyme that catalyzes the first committed step in peptidoglycan biosynthesis of bacteria:

phosphoenolpyruvate + UDP-N-acetyl-D-glucosamine  phosphate + UDP-N-acetyl-3-O-(1-carboxyvinyl)-D-glucosamine

Thus, the two substrates of this enzyme are phosphoenolpyruvate and UDP-N-acetyl-D-glucosamine, whereas its two products are phosphate and UDP-N-acetyl-3-O-(1-carboxyvinyl)-D-glucosamine. The pyruvate moiety provides the linker that bridges the glycan and peptide portion of peptidoglycan.

The enzyme is inhibited by the antibiotic fosfomycin, which covalently modifies an active site cysteine residue.

This enzyme belongs to the family of transferases, specifically those transferring aryl or alkyl groups other than methyl groups. The systematic name of this enzyme class is phosphoenolpyruvate:UDP-N-acetyl-D-glucosamine 1-carboxyvinyltransferase.  This enzyme participates in amino sugars metabolism and glycan biosynthesis.

Structural studies

References

Literature 

EC 2.5.1
Enzymes of known structure